Sir Arthur Sims (27 July 1877 – 27 April 1969) was a New Zealand first-class cricketer, businessman and philanthropist.

Early life
Sims was born in 1877 in Lincolnshire, England, the second son of Samuel and Louisa Sims, who were farmers. In 1880 they migrated to New Zealand, where Samuel managed a farm near Kaitangata in South Otago that belonged to James Rutherford, a member of the New Zealand House of Representatives. In 1884, after Rutherford died, the family moved to Canterbury, where Samuel managed the farm near Ashburton owned by another politician, John Grigg, one of the founders of the New Zealand frozen meat industry.

Arthur attended his local school until he won a scholarship to Christchurch Boys' High School. He moved to Christchurch in 1890, boarding with family friends during the school term and returning home during the holidays. He played for the school First XI for several years, scoring over 1000 runs and taking over 100 wickets in his last two years and captaining the team in his final year, 1895. After he left school, John Grigg helped him find a clerical position with the Canterbury Frozen Meat Company in Christchurch.

While working at the meat works Sims studied in the evenings at Canterbury College. He gained his BA and continued on to an MA. After that he studied accountancy and became a qualified accountant.

Career
Sims played cricket for Canterbury, New Zealand and, in 1914, for Australia. In 1913–14 he captained an Australian XI in New Zealand, putting on 433 runs for the 8th wicket in 181 minutes with Victor Trumper in the match against Canterbury, which remains the world record for that wicket in first-class cricket.

He was knighted in the 1950 New Year Honours "[f]or services to medicine and education in the British Commonwealth."

He founded the Sir Arthur Sims Scholarship for graduates of Australian and Canadian universities to study in the United Kingdom.

A biography, 84 Not Out: The Story of Sir Arthur Sims, Kt. by Alan Mitchell, was published in 1962.

References

External links
 
 
 
 Sims, Sir Arthur (1877–1969) from Plarr's Lives of the Fellows

1877 births
1969 deaths
New Zealand cricketers
Pre-1930 New Zealand representative cricketers
Australian cricketers
Canterbury cricketers
People from West Lindsey District
Cricket players and officials awarded knighthoods
People from East Hoathly
New Zealand Knights Bachelor